Hans Stuck (pronounced "shtook"; sometimes called Hans Stuck von Villiez; 27 December 1900 – 9 February 1978) was a German motor racing driver. Both his son Hans-Joachim Stuck (born 1951) and his grandsons Johannes and Ferdinand Stuck became race drivers.

Despite many successes in Grand Prix motor racing for Auto Union in the early 1930s, during the era of the famous "Silver Arrows", he is now mostly known for his domination of hillclimbing, which earned him the nickname "Bergkönig" or "King of the Mountains".

Pre-WWII career
Stuck's experience with car racing started in 1922 with early morning runs bringing milk from his farm to Munich, shortly after his first marriage. This eventually led to his taking up hill-climbing; he won his first race, at Baden-Baden, in 1923. A few years later, after a year as a privateer for Austro-Daimler, he became a works driver for them in 1927, doing well in hill climbs, and making his first appearance in a circuit race (the German Grand Prix) that year as well. In 1931, Austro-Daimler left racing, and Stuck eventually wound up driving a Mercedes-Benz SSKL  in sports car racing, where he continued to excel.

In 1933, his acquaintance with Adolf Hitler (whom he had met by chance on a hunting trip in 1925) led to his involvement with Ferdinand Porsche and Auto Union in Hitler's plans for German auto racing. With his experience from racing up mountain passes in the Alps in the 1920s, he was virtually unbeatable when he got the new Auto Union car, which was designed by Porsche. Its rear mounted engine provided superior traction compared to conventional front engine designs, so that its (eventually) 500+ horse-power could be transformed into speed even on non-paved roads. In circuit racing, the new car was very hard to master, though, due to the swing axle rear suspension design in combination of the weight distribution of its rear engine design.

His career with Auto Union was quite successful. In 1934, he won the German, Swiss and Czechoslovakian Grand Prix races (as well as finishing second in the Italian Grand Prix and Eifelrennen). There was no European Championship for the circuit races that year, or he would have won it. Wins in a number of hill-climb races brought him European Mountain Champion, the first of three he would eventually collect.

In 1935, he won the Italian Grand Prix (along with second at the German Grand Prix; he also won his usual collection of hill-climb wins, again taking the European Mountain Championship. 1936 was leaner; he placed second in the Tripoli and German Grands Prix, finishing second in the competition for the European Championship. After Stuck missed a number of hill-climbs because of injuries suffered in accidents, that year the European Mountain Championship fell to his famous team-mate, Bernd Rosemeyer. 1937 was equally lean, bringing only second places in the Rio de Janeiro and Belgian Grands Prix.

1938 opened poorly; Stuck was either fired from, or quit, the Auto Union team (accounts from the two sides differ). After a series of injuries to other team drivers, as well as pressure from the German government (again, accounts differ as to what combination of factors was the cause), he was re-hired, and proved himself by winning a third European Mountain Championship, his last major pre-war success.

Post-WWII career
After the war, although Germans were banned from racing until 1950, Stuck obtained Austrian citizenship and immediately continued racing.
A link with Alex von Falkenhausen (not to be confused with the contemporaneous general of the same name) led to Stuck driving for his team in Formula Two racing, although with little success.

He drove a Porsche Spyder in 1953, also with no success. A liaison with BMW, starting in 1957, was more fruitful, although his first hill-climbs for them (in a Type 507) were not. A switch to their tiny BMW 700 RS did the trick, and at age 60, he became German Hillclimb Champion for the last time. He decided to retire on a high note, and thereupon closed his professional driving career.

As an instructor on the Nürburgring, he taught his son Hans-Joachim the secrets of this challenging circuit.

Personal life
Stuck was born in Warsaw in 1900. Although his parents were of Swiss ancestry, they had moved to Germany by the time Stuck was born, and he grew up there.

He was called up for military service in World War I in 1917. In 1918, his older brother Walter was killed, along with Walter's commanding officer; as a result, Stuck met the commander's sister, Ellen Hahndorff, and they were married in 1922. After several years, Stuck's involvement in the fast life on the track as well as off it caused them to split up and divorce.

In 1931, he met Paula von Reznicek, a famous tennis player; they were married in 1932. The fact that she had a Jewish grandfather caused Stuck some problems with the rise of the Nazis, but his personal relationship with Hitler saved him from serious trouble.

In 1939, he met Christa Thielmann, at that point engaged to Paula's youngest brother. Stuck and Paula divorced in 1948, and he married Christa that year. Their son, Hans-Joachim Stuck, was born in 1951. Christa died in 2014, at the age of 93.

Racing record

Complete European Championship results
(key) (Races in bold indicate pole position) (Races in italics indicate fastest lap)

Notes
 – Not listed in the Championship.

Complete Formula One World Championship results 
(key)

References

Further reading
 Chris Nixon, Racing the Silver Arrows: Mercedes-Benz versus Auto Union 1934-1939 (Osprey, London, 1986) pp. 30–37, 164-168
 Reuß, Eberhard: Hitlers Rennschlachten. Die Silberpfeile unterm Hakenkreuz. Aufbau-Verlag, Berlin 2006, .
 Seper, Hans, Pfundner, Martin, Lenz, Hans Peter: Österreichische Automobilgeschichte. Eurotax, Wien 1999, .

Bibliography
 Hans Stuck and E. G. Burggaller (editors), Motoring Sport (G.T. Foulis, London, 1935) Although this is a collection of items by various writers, it does contain a number of items by Stuck

External links
 Die Silberpfeile - Hans Stuck 
 From Austria to Auto-Union and back
 

1900 births
1978 deaths
German racing drivers
German Army personnel of World War I
Grand Prix drivers
German Formula One drivers
AFM Formula One drivers
BRM Formula One drivers
Écurie Espadon Formula One drivers
People from Garmisch-Partenkirchen (district)
Sportspeople from Upper Bavaria
National Socialist Motor Corps members
European Championship drivers